Arubolana is a genus of crustacean in the family Cirolanidae, containing the following species:
Arubolana aruboides (Bowman & Iliffe, 1983)
Arubolana imula Botosaneanu & Stock, 1979
Arubolana parvioculata Notenboom, 1984

References

Cymothoida
Taxonomy articles created by Polbot